Chill Pill is the fourth album by the American metal band Warrior Soul, released in 1993. It was remastered and re-released with bonus tracks in 2006 by Escapi Music. Michael Monroe of Hanoi Rocks played harmonica on "High Road".

Critical reception

The Calgary Herald noted the "high intensity mile-a-minute guitars, bottom string bass chords and drums like hammers hitting nail heads."

AllMusic wrote that "its entire first half (kicked off in typical Warrior Soul fashion by an angry psycho-babble rant set to music entitled 'Mars') rolls by without a single memorable moment."

Track listing 

 "Mars" – 2:21
 "Cargos of Doom" – 3:55
 "Song in Your Mind" – 4:52
 "Shock Um Down" – 3:06
 "Let Me Go" – 4:45
 "Ha Ha Ha" – 5:01
 "Concrete Frontier" – 7:21
 "I Want Some" – 3:11
 "Soft" – 6:25
 "High Road" – 6:37
 "Mars (Live)" – 2:45 [2006 Escapi bonus track]
 "Cargos of doom (Live)" – 3:48 [2009 Escapi bonus rack]
 "Song in your mind (Live)" – 4:43 [2009 Escapi bonus track]
 "Shock um down (Live)" – 2:53 [2009 Escapi bonus track]
 "Mark & Kory Interview / New drummer Pete (The Tempest)" – 3:16 [2009 Escapi bonus track]

Personnel
 Kory Clarke – lead vocals
 John Ricco – guitar
 Pete McClanahan – bass
 Mark Evans – drums
 Michael Monroe – harmonica

References

Warrior Soul albums
1993 albums
Albums produced by Don Fury